Dark academia is an internet aesthetic and subculture concerned with higher education, the arts, and literature, or an idealised version thereof. The aesthetic centres on traditional educational clothing, interior design, activities such as writing/poetry, ancient art, classic literature, as well as classical Greek and Collegiate Gothic architecture. The trend emerged on social media site Tumblr in 2015, before being popularised by adolescents and young adults in the late 2010s and early 2020s, particularly during the COVID-19 pandemic.

Aesthetic 

The fashion of the 1930s and 1940s features prominently in the dark academia aesthetic, particularly clothing associated with attendance at Oxbridge, Ivy League schools, and prep schools of the period. A number of the articles of clothing most associated with the aesthetic are cardigans, blazers, dress shirts, plaid skirts, Oxford shoes, and clothing made of houndstooth and tweed, its colour palette consisting mainly of black, white, beige, browns, dark green, and occasionally navy blue.

The subculture draws on idealised aesthetics of higher education and academia, often with books and libraries featuring prominently. Activities such as calligraphy, museum visits, libraries, coffee shops, and all-night studying sessions are common among proponents.

Seasonal imagery of autumn is also common. Imagery of Gothic and Collegiate Gothic architecture, candlelight, dark wooden furniture, and dense, cluttered rooms often occurs. The subculture has been described as maximalist and nostalgic. Universities that are often featured in dark academia imageboards include Oxbridge, Durham University, the University of Edinburgh, the University of Glasgow and Harvard University.

The subculture shares similarities with Goth subculture, tending to romanticise the finding of beauty and poetry in dark themes. Tim Brinkhof of Big Think has stated that "moody architecture and philosophical pessimism" are key aspects of the aesthetic. Hannah Southwick of USA Today has described it as a "melancholic aesthetic," citing a fashion stylist who described it as "boarding school meets goth enthusiast."

History 
In 2015, the trend emerged on social media site Tumblr, with the creation of a book club that centered around classic and Gothic novels. The aesthetic then grew into a distinct subculture, seeing a wave of popularisation on Instagram led by Ryan Taylor and Maria Teresa Negro in 2017.

Dark academia rose in popularity during the COVID-19 pandemic. Increased interest in dark academia been credited to the shutdown of schools.

Works 
A number of classic works of literature, such as Oscar Wilde's The Picture of Dorian Gray and Maurice by E. M. Forster, as well as the works of writers such as Lord Byron and Percy Bysshe Shelley, have been cited as either influential or popular among the subculture, or fitting within the subculture's aesthetics. 

Donna Tartt's novel The Secret History, published in 1992, which tells the story of a murder that takes place within a group of classics students at an elite New England college, has been credited as being the inspiration for the trend. Other more recent books, such as R. F. Kuang's novel Babel, J.K. Rowling's Harry Potter series, If We Were Villains by M. L. Rio, Piranesi by Susanna Clarke, Ninth House by Leigh Bardugo, and Under the Porticoes by S. Sharpentier' have also been included.

A number of films and TV series have also been credited as fitting into the aesthetic. The 1989 film Dead Poets Society and the 2013 film Kill Your Darlings have in particular been credited as among the sources of inspiration for dark academia. Writing for Screen Rant, Kayleena Pierce-Bohen has listed TV shows such as Ares, The Umbrella Academy, A Series of Unfortunate Events, The Queen’s Gambit and The Magicians as among works that fit within the aesthetics.

Reception 

BookRiot writer Zoe Robertson stated that the subculture draws on "seductive depictions of shadowy extravagance" and reminds her "to see the rot in the foundations of an institution I can't stay away from, and build my own school in defiance." One writer compared it to the contemporary cottagecore lifestyle aesthetic, saying that while cottagecore requires a home in the country and leisure time for crafting, dark academia's "simple act of putting on a blazer and reading Dostoevsky is far more doable."

Some commentators have attributed the rise in popularity of the subculture as a reaction to cuts to university funding and the corporatisation of higher education. Honi Soit writer Ezara Norton stated that it "reveals a deep disillusionment with [education models that devalue knowledge unless it can be used to generate profit], and a longing for a space free to learn unencumbered by a neoliberal agenda." Writing for Jacobin, Amelia Horgan argued that the trend was in part a response to the COVID-19 pandemic, which resulted in students leaving campuses to learn in their family homes where many did not have access to adequate study space, providing "a fantasy of the university experience" which they were unable to obtain. However she also noted that the world presented in the aesthetic was very different to that of the contemporary university, highlighting trends in UK academia an example of the impacts of neoliberal policies on education, including long hours and casualisation for teaching staff and students having to work multiple part-time jobs to cover their costs.

In part in reaction to the growth of the subculture, the related "light academia" subculture has experienced a rise in popularity, often featuring lighter and softer imagery and colours and more overt emphasis on optimism.

Criticism

Dark academia has been criticized for a variety of reasons, including the aesthetic's perceived Eurocentrism, lack of diversity and glamorisation of unhealthy lifestyle choices. 

Critics of the aesthetic have argued that the English literary canon from which it draws inspiration is an overwhelmingly white one, with Tim Brinkof claiming that associated content creators "prefer to discuss Oscar Wilde and Emily Dickinson over Toni Morrison or James Baldwin". Sarah Burton, a sociology fellow at City, University of London, has noted that the aesthetic contains little representation of "most women, working class, people of colour, fatness, people with low economic or cultural capital, disability, caring and domestic activities and labour (especially the enjoyment of these), motherhood, queerness, and the mundanity of academic life". In response to the aesthetic's lack of diversity, efforts have been made to incorporate literary works from Black authors such as Langston Hughes into dark academia.

The sub-culture has also been criticised as elitist and as an "old money aesthetic". Drawing on the threefold typology of educational traditions outlined by Raymond Williams in his book The Long Revolution, Amelia Horgan has described dark academia as being rooted in the attitudes of "old humanists committed to preserving and sustaining a traditional and hierarchical culture while preserving the legacy of humanistic study." Amy Crawford of the University of Dundee has stated that the sub-culture "tends to romanticise European upper-class education." Kevin N. Dalby of the University of Texas at Austin has stated that "its association with higher learning and Ivy League schools, in particular, creates elitism that does not enable just anyone to be a part of the group." Conversely, other commentators have noted that fashion items associated with the trend are easily and cheaply sourced from thrift stores.

Others have argued that the aesthetic places too much emphasis on the aesthetic of art and higher education instead of proper study and analysis of these works, leading to misinterpretations of the source material. It has also faced criticism for potentially glamourising unhealthy behaviours, such as sleep deprivation, overworking, and substance misuse.

See also 
 Bohemianism
 Classicism
 Cottagecore
 Goblincore
 Dark romanticism
 Neo-Victorian
 Romanticism
 Steampunk

References 

Fashion aesthetics
Internet memes
2010s fads and trends
2020s fads and trends
Subcultures
Youth culture
Academic culture